Political entities in the 7th century BC – Political entities in the 5th century BC – Political entities by century

This is a list of sovereign states or polities that existed in the 6th century BC.

Africa

Americas

Europe

North and West

South and East

Eurasian Steppe and Central Asia

East Asia

South Asia

West Asia

See also
List of Bronze Age states
List of Iron Age states
List of Classical Age states
List of states during Late Antiquity
List of states during the Middle Ages

References

-06
6th century BC-related lists